Tipi Tainui Ropiha  (1895–1978) was a notable New Zealand  surveyor and senior public servant. Of Māori descent, he identified with the Ngāti Kahungunu and Rangitāne iwi. He was born in Waipawa, New Zealand, in 1895. His daughter, Rina Winifred Moore, was the first Maori woman to graduate as a doctor.

Ropiha was the first Māori person to become Secretary of Māori Affairs (the administrative head of the Department of Māori Affairs), a role he held from 1948 to 1957.

In the 1952 Queen's Birthday Honours, Ropiha was appointed a Companion of the Imperial Service Order. Ropiha was made a Commander of the Order of the British Empire, for very valuable services to the Māori race, in the 1972 Queen's Birthday Honours.

References

1895 births
1978 deaths
New Zealand Māori public servants
New Zealand public servants
Ngāti Kahungunu people
Rangitāne people
New Zealand surveyors
People from Waipawa
New Zealand Commanders of the Order of the British Empire
New Zealand Companions of the Imperial Service Order